Jamie Rooney (born July 31, 1984 in Arthur, Ontario) is a Canadian lacrosse player who plays for the Buffalo Bandits in the National Lacrosse League.

Professional career
Rooney began his professional career with the Philadelphia Wings in the 2008 NLL season.  He was drafted by the Wings in the second round (22nd overall) of the 2007 National Lacrosse League dispersal draft from the Arizona Sting. Previously, Rooney was drafted in the 2004 Entry Draft by the Buffalo Bandits, and was also signed as a free agent with the Calgary Roughnecks in 2006, but never appeared in a game for either team

Prior to the 2009 NLL season, Rooney was acquired by the New York Titans in the 2008 dispersal draft. He played in ten games for the Titans before being traded to Rochester for Bill Greer. Midway through the 2010 season, Rooney was traded again, this time to the Boston Blazers.

The Blazers ceased operations following the 2011 season, and a dispersal draft was held. Rooney was taken in the first round (8th overall) by the Washington Stealth. Rooney was subsequently released by the Stealth, and then signed by the Toronto Rock.

Statistics

NLL
Reference:

References

1984 births
Living people
Boston Blazers players
Canadian lacrosse players
Lacrosse people from Ontario
New York Titans (lacrosse) players
People from Wellington County, Ontario
Philadelphia Wings players
Rochester Knighthawks players
Washington Stealth players